Citizen X is a 1995 American television film which covers the efforts of detectives in the Soviet Union to capture an unknown serial killer of women and children in the 1980s, and the successive bureaucratic obstacles they consistently encounter. The film is based upon the true story of Soviet serial killer Andrei Chikatilo, who was convicted in 1992 of the murder of 52 women and children committed between 1978 and 1990. It stars Stephen Rea, Donald Sutherland, and Max Von Sydow.

The film is based on Robert Cullen's non-fiction book The Killer Department, published in 1993.

Plot
A body is discovered on a collective farm during harvesting in 1982. A subsequent search of adjacent woods, authorized by newly installed forensic specialist, Viktor Burakov, turns up seven more bodies in varying stages of decomposition. The film tells the story of the subsequent eight-year hunt by Burakov for the serial killer responsible for the mutilation and murder of 53 people, 52 of them below the age of 35. Burakov is promoted to detective and eventually aided, covertly at first, by Col. Mikhail Fetisov, his commanding officer and the shrewd head of the provincial committee for crime, and, much later, by Alexandr Bukhanovsky, a psychiatrist with a particular interest in what he calls "abnormal psychology".

As well as taking on the form of a crime thriller, the movie depicts Soviet propaganda and bureaucracy that contributed to the failure of law enforcement agencies to capture the killer, Andrei Chikatilo, for almost a decade. Chikatilo's crimes were not reported publicly for years. Local politicians were fearful such revelations would have a negative impact on the USSR's image, since serial killers were associated with "decadent, Western" moral corruption.

Chikatilo first came under scrutiny early in the search when he was spotted at a station and found holding a satchel bag containing a knife. He was promptly arrested. Unfortunately, he was shielded from investigation and released due to his membership in the Communist Party. Additionally, the Soviet crime labs erroneously reported that his blood type did not match that found at the murders. All this changed under the political reforms of glasnost and Perestroika, and the search for the killer began to make progress.

With the passage of time and easing of political restrictions, Burakov devises a plan to blanket almost all the railroad stations, where the serial killer preys upon the young and unsuspecting, with conspicuous uniformed men to discourage the killer. Three small stations, however, are left unattended, except for undercover agents. Chikatilo is eventually discovered and identified through the diligence of a local, plainclothes soldier.

Arrested, Andrei Chikatilo is interrogated for seven consecutive days by Gorbunov, a Soviet hardliner who insists that he be the one to extract a confession. Chikatilo will not yield and, under pressure from Fetisov and Burakov, Gorbunov agrees to another approach. Psychiatrist Bukhanovsky is introduced into the interview room. He recites from his lengthy analysis and speculation, made three years earlier, of the personality and tendencies of this sexually frustrated killer, whom he had entitled "Citizen X". Bukhanovsky eventually strikes a nerve, and a weeping Chikatilo finally admits his guilt and answers specific questions about the details of some murders. Afterwards, Chikatilo leads law enforcement officials to the crime scenes and three additional undetected graves.

Held in a metal cage during his trial, a wild-eyed Chikatilo is convicted and sentenced to death. The film concludes with Chikatilo being led to a nameless prison chamber and shows him staring in shock at a central drain in the room's floor as a uniformed soldier delivers a pistol shot to the back of the killer's head.

Cast
 Stephen Rea as Lieutenant (later Colonel) Viktor Burakov
 Donald Sutherland as Colonel (later General) Mikhail Fetisov
 Jeffrey DeMunn as Andrei Chikatilo
 Max von Sydow as Dr. Alexandr Bukhanovsky
 Joss Ackland as Bondarchuk
 John Wood as Gorbunov
 Ion Caramitru as Tatevsky
 Imelda Staunton as Ms. Burakova

Production

Locations
The film was shot in Hungary. The station where Chikatilo picks his victims is the Hatvan railway station, northeast of Budapest. The smaller, arched train shelter scene was shot in Nagymaros, Gödöllő, and Szokolya. Several other scenes were shot in the Gödöllő Railway Station.

Director
The film was directed by Chris Gerolmo, who additionally wrote the screenplay (adapted from Robert Cullen's 1993 non-fiction book The Killer Department) in addition to playing a minor role in the film as a militiaman.

Soundtrack
The score for Citizen X was composed and conducted by Randy Edelman. It has been released on CD in the US by Varèse Sarabande.

Reception

Critical reception
Citizen X was met with positive reviews from critics and audiences. It earned an 86% score on the movie review aggregator site Rotten Tomatoes. Scott Weinberg of eFilmCritic.com described it as "Fascinating and absorbing. One of HBO's finest made-for-cable flicks."

Awards
 CableACE Awards
 Best Movie or Miniseries
 Best Supporting Actor in a Movie or Miniseries (Jeffrey DeMunn)
 Edgar Awards
 Best TV Feature or MiniSeries (Chris Gerolmo)
 Emmy Awards
 Outstanding Supporting Actor in a Miniseries or a Special (Donald Sutherland)
 Golden Globe Awards
 Best Actor in a Supporting Role in a Series, Mini-Series or Motion Picture Made for TV (Donald Sutherland)
 Sitges Film Festival
 Best Film

Home media
Citizen X has been released on DVD in the US (HBO, region 1 NTSC), Germany (Cargo Records, region 2 PAL), Denmark (Scanbox, region 2 PAL) and the Netherlands (Paradiso Home Entertainment, region 2 PAL). The film received theatrical release in some territories and was exhibited in the widescreen 1.85:1 aspect ratio. Only the German DVD has a widescreen transfer; all others reflect the 1990s 1.33:1 TV aspect ratio, as originally broadcast.

See also
 Crime in the Soviet Union

References

External links
 
 

1990s crime drama films
1990s thriller films
1990s serial killer films
1995 television films
1995 films
American serial killer films
Crime television films
American drama television films
American thriller television films
Biographical films about serial killers
American docudrama films
Edgar Award-winning works
Films about capital punishment
Films based on non-fiction books
Films set in 1982
Films set in 1983
Films set in 1984
Films set in 1986
Films set in 1987
Films set in 1990
Films set in 1994
Films set in the Soviet Union
Films shot in Hungary
HBO Films films
Scanbox Entertainment films
American police detective films
Crime films based on actual events
Films scored by Randy Edelman
Cultural depictions of Russian men
Cultural depictions of Ukrainian men
Cultural depictions of male serial killers
1990s American films